Fiona Farrell  (born 1947) is a New Zealand poet, fiction and non-fiction writer and playwright.

Early years and education 
Fiona Farrell was born and raised in Oamaru, in the South Island of New Zealand. She attended Waitaki Girls' High School, then graduated with a Bachelor of Arts from the University of Otago in 1968. Farrell moved to Oxford in the United Kingdom with her husband after graduating and was enrolled at the University of London in Art History. She and her husband then moved to Canada where Farrell graduated MA (1973) and M.Phil in Drama (1976) at Toronto University. She worked as a drama lecturer at the Palmerston North Teachers' College and lived in Palmerston North from 1976 to 1991 where she began her writing career creating plays with New Zealand content for her students.

Career 
Farrell has held numerous residencies and been recognised for her writing in many ways including at the New Zealand Book Awards where she has been a finalist in all three categories, for fiction, non-fiction and poetry. Her first novel, The Skinny Louie Book, won the fiction award in 1993, and three subsequent novels have been shortlisted for the award. Four have been nominated for the International Dublin IMPAC Award. Two works of non-fiction, The Broken Book (2011) and The Villa at the Edge of the Empire, a study of the impact of the earthquakes of 2010-2011 on her then home town, Christchurch (2015), were shortlisted for the non-fiction award. Her poetry collection, The Pop-Up Book of Invasions, written while she held a writing residency in Donoughmore, Ireland, was a finalist in the poetry section at the 2008 NZ Book Awards. She has been a frequent guest at festivals throughout New Zealand and abroad, at Adelaide, Vancouver, Salisbury UK and Edinburgh. Between 1992 and 2017, she lived with her husband, Doug Hood, at Otanerito, a remote bay on Banks Peninsula, where their home was one of the accommodation points on the Banks Peninsula Track. Farrell has two daughters and four grand daughters. She is now based in Dunedin.

Awards and honours
She has won several awards for short fiction, including the Bank of New Zealand Katherine Mansfield Memorial Award and the American Express Award.
1983 inaugural Bruce Mason Playwriting Award
1990 The Perils of Pauline Smith' (1990) won the Mobil Award for Best Radio Drama
1991–1992 Canterbury University Writer in Residence 
'Chook Chook' (1992) remains one of Playmarket's most frequently requested scripts
1993 The Skinny Louie Book (Penguin, 1992) won the 1993 New Zealand Book Award for Fiction
1995 recipient of the Meridian Energy Katherine Mansfield Memorial Fellowship
2003, 2005 The Hopeful Traveller (Random House, 2002) and Book Book (Random House, 2004) were runners-up at the Montana New Zealand Book Awards in 2003 and 2005 respectively, and were also nominated for International IMPAC Dublin Literary Awards 2003 and 2005.
2006  Rathcoola Residency in Donoughmore, Ireland
2007 Prime Minister's Awards for Literary Achievement worth $60,000.
2008 The Pop-Up Book of Invasions (Auckland University Press, 2007) was runner-up in the poetry category at the 2008 Montana New Zealand Book Awards.
2009 Mr Allbones' Ferrets (Random House, 2007) was nominated for the 2009 Dublin IMPAC Award
2010 Finalist in the 2010 New Zealand Book Awards in the Fiction category for her novel, Limestone (Random House, 2009)
2011 Robert Burns Fellow
2012 Appointed Officer of the New Zealand Order of Merit, for services to literature, in the 2012 Queen's Birthday and Diamond Jubilee Honours
2013 Awarded the $100,000 Creative New Zealand Michael King Writer's Fellowship to research and write twin books, one fiction and one non-fiction, inspired by her experiences of the Christchurch earthquakes
2016 The Villa at the Edge of the Empire: One Hundred Ways to Read a City was a finalist for the Non-Fiction section of the 2016 Ockham New Zealand Book Awards.
2022 Fellow of the Academy of New Zealand Literature

Bibliography
Novels:
 The Skinny Louie Book (Penguin, 1992)
 Six Clever Girls Who Became Famous Women (1996)
 The Hopeful Traveller (Vintage, 2002)
 Book Book (Vintage, 2004)
 Mr Allbones' Ferrets (Vintage, 2007; Thomas Dunne Books, 2009)
 Limestone (Vintage, 2009)
 Decline and Fall on Savage Street (Penguin Random House, 2017)

Poetry:
 Cutting Out (Auckland University Press, 1987)
 The Inhabited Initial (Auckland University Press, 1999)
 The Pop-Up Book of Invasions (Auckland University Press, 2007)
 Nouns, verbs, etc. (selected poems) (Otago University Press, 2020)

Short Stories:  
 The Rock Garden (Auckland University Press, 1989)
 Light Readings (Vintage, 2001)

Non-fiction: 
 The Quake Year (with photographer Juliet Nicholas; Canterbury University Press, 2012)
 The Villa at the Edge of the Empire (Vintage, 2015)

Essays and poetry:
 The Broken Book (Auckland University Press, 2011)

Plays include:

Chook Chook (Playmarket)
In Confidence: Dialogues with Amy Bock (Playmarket). Devised for the WSA Conference at Massey University, 1982. Premiered at BATS Theatre.
Waihi, 1912 (Playmarket)
Snap! Adapted from Dame Ngaio Marsh’s novel Photo Finish.

References

External links
Official website
https://www.bookcouncil.org.nz/writer/farrell-fiona
https://www.anzliterature.com

1947 births
Living people
New Zealand women novelists
New Zealand women short story writers
Officers of the New Zealand Order of Merit
20th-century New Zealand poets
New Zealand women poets
20th-century New Zealand novelists
21st-century New Zealand novelists
21st-century New Zealand women writers
21st-century New Zealand poets
20th-century New Zealand short story writers
21st-century New Zealand short story writers
20th-century New Zealand women writers
New Zealand women dramatists and playwrights
20th-century New Zealand dramatists and playwrights
21st-century New Zealand dramatists and playwrights